Wicomico County Public Schools is the public school district for Wicomico County, Maryland. WCPS has 24 schools, consisting of 16 elementary, 1 elementary/middle, 3 middle, 1 middle/high, and 3 high schools.

The district has over 15,000 students and close to 1,300 teachers.  It is the largest school district on the Eastern Shore.

Demographics
Ethnic composition of the district in 2020 was 44% Caucasian, 37% African American, 11% Hispanic/Latino, 3% Asian, 8% two races. As of 2020, the 4-year adjusted cohort graduation rate was 83.93%.

Board of Education
The Wicomico County Board of Education was previously appointed by the Governor of Maryland. Beginning with the November 2018 election, the board transitioned to fully elected.  It has one member elected from each of the five council districts, plus two elected at-large, in a non-partisan manner.

List of Schools 
The following are statistics from the FY 2023 Educational Facilities Master Plan - Facilities Inventory.

Elementary 

Delmar Elementary was previously until grade 6, but changed to being up to grade 5 in 2000 upon the opening of the new Delmar Middle School/Delmar High School complex of the Delmar School District. Residents of Delmar, Maryland may attend the Delmar, Delaware schools or they may attend Wicomico Middle School.

Middle 

In the late 1990s there was a movement to have Salisbury Middle School named after Charles Chipman, an African-American teacher who worked at Wicomico County schools. He originated from New Jersey.

High

References

External links

School districts in Maryland
Education in Wicomico County, Maryland
Education in Sussex County, Delaware